Procious is an unincorporated community in Clay County, West Virginia, United States. Procious has a post office with ZIP code 25164.

Adam Procious, an early postmaster, gave the community his name.

The community was left in ruins by the 2016 West Virginia flood.

Climate
The climate in this area is characterized by hot, humid summers and generally mild to cool winters.  According to the Köppen Climate Classification system, Procious has a humid subtropical climate, abbreviated "Cfa" on climate maps.

References

Unincorporated communities in Clay County, West Virginia
Unincorporated communities in West Virginia